Musa lawitiensis is a species of wild banana (genus Musa), native to the island of Borneo (both the Indonesian and Malaysian portions). It is placed in section Callimusa (now including the former section Australimusa), having a diploid chromosome number of 2n = 20.

References

lawitiensis
Endemic flora of Borneo
Plants described in 1998